Viktoriya Troytskaya (née Taranina, ; born April 18, 1969) is a Russian short track speed skater who competed for the Unified Team in the 1992 Winter Olympics and for Russia in the 1994 Winter Olympics.

In 1992 she was a member of the relay team for the Unified Team which won the bronze medal in the 3000 metre relay competition. In the 500 m event she finished 17th.

Two years later she finished fifth with the Russian relay team in the 3000 metre relay contest. In the 500 m competition she finished 20th and in the 1000 m event she finished 29th.

External links
 profile

1969 births
Living people
Russian female short track speed skaters
Olympic short track speed skaters of the Unified Team
Soviet female short track speed skaters
Olympic short track speed skaters of Russia
Short track speed skaters at the 1992 Winter Olympics
Short track speed skaters at the 1994 Winter Olympics
Olympic bronze medalists for the Unified Team
Olympic medalists in short track speed skating
Russian female speed skaters
Medalists at the 1992 Winter Olympics